Ivy Scott (1886 - 3 February 1947) was an Australian stage actress and opera singer.

She was born at sea off the coast of Java, "her christening robe was the Union Jack" and the birth was registered on Thursday Island. Her Scottish parents were migrating to Australia and they had wanted the baby born in North Queensland, where her father was hired to be the inspector of schools. She was raised in the Croydon, Queensland gold fields. She made her theatrical debut in Hans, the Boatman. She came to the United States in 1910. She was with the National Broadcasting Company since 1925 and for seven years had her own radio program. She sang on all of NBC's light opera and Gilbert and Sullivan shows. She was the original Mrs. Hudson in NBC's Sherlock Holmes series, and the Madam Louise in The Goldbergs radio show. She had a Broadway career from 1932 to 1946. In 1942 she was living on Staten Island. She had a son, Harry E. Walker (1920–1998), who was a chemical engineer with the Shell Oil in Wood River, Illinois. She died in 1947.

Performances

Theatre
Music in the Air (1932)
Revenge with Music (1934)
Three Waltzes (1937)
Too Many Girls (1939)
Liberty Jones (1941)
Sunny River (1941)
Song of Norway (1944–1946)

Filmography

References

External links

Ivy Scott at the New York Times

1886 births
1947 deaths
People from Staten Island
Australian stage actresses
19th-century Australian actresses
People born at sea